Amanda Rankin (born 22 October 1976) is an Australian sprint canoeist who has competed since the mid-2000s. She won a bronze medal in the K-4 1000 m event at the 2003 ICF Canoe Sprint World Championships in Gainesville.

Rankin also competed at the 2004 Summer Olympics in Athens, finishing sixth in the K-4 500 m event while being eliminated in the semifinals of the K-1 500 m event.

References

External links
 
 
 

1976 births
Australian female canoeists
Canoeists at the 2004 Summer Olympics
Living people
Olympic canoeists of Australia
ICF Canoe Sprint World Championships medalists in kayak
21st-century Australian women